German submarine U-342 was a Type VIIC U-boat of Nazi Germany's Kriegsmarine during World War II.

She was on her first patrol when she was sunk by a Canadian aircraft on 17 April 1944.

She did not sink or damage any ships.

Design
German Type VIIC submarines were preceded by the shorter Type VIIB submarines. U-342 had a displacement of  when at the surface and  while submerged. She had two shafts and two  propellers.

U-342 was fitted with five  torpedo tubes (four fitted at the bow and one at the stern), fourteen torpedoes, one  SK C/35 naval gun, 220 rounds, and two twin  C/30 anti-aircraft guns. The boat had a complement of between forty-four and sixty.

Service history
The submarine was laid down on 7 December 1941 at the Nordseewerke yard at Emden as yard number 214, launched on 10 November 1942 and commissioned on 12 January 1943 under the command of Oberleutnant zur See Albert Hossenfelder.

U-342 served with the 8th U-boat Flotilla, for training and then with the 7th flotilla for operations from 1 March 1944.

Patrol
U-342 had sailed from Kiel in Germany to Bergen in Norway in March 1944, but her patrol began when she departed Bergen on 3 April and headed for the Atlantic Ocean. She had passed through the gap between Iceland and the Faroe Islands, but was attacked and sunk by a Canadian Canso (PBY Catalina) of No. 162 Squadron RCAF southwest of Iceland on 17 April.

Fifty-one men died; there were no survivors.

References

Bibliography

External links
 

German Type VIIC submarines
U-boats commissioned in 1943
U-boats sunk in 1944
U-boats sunk by Canadian aircraft
U-boats sunk by depth charges
World War II submarines of Germany
World War II shipwrecks in the Atlantic Ocean
1942 ships
Ships built in Emden
Ships lost with all hands
Maritime incidents in April 1944